Bel Air Church (also known as Bel Air Presbyterian Church) is a Presbyterian church located in Los Angeles, California. Its campus is located on Mulholland Drive in the Encino neighborhood.

History 
The Bel Air Church was founded in 1956 in Los Angeles. The church is on the "Educational Corridor" on Mulholland Drive, on a hill overlooking the San Fernando Valley. On Jewish High Holy Days, the Church hosts services for the Stephen S. Wise Temple, a Reform Jewish congregation in the same neighborhood as Bel Air Church.

In 2007, the church completed a $12 million campus expansion program, The Campaign for Bel Air: Phase I, which included the two-story Education Building, Discipleship Center, and Administration Building, including staff offices overlooking the San Fernando Valley. The campus also has a full-service café.

Former senior pastors include Louis H. Evans Jr., Mark Brewer, Michael H. Wenning, Paul Pierson, David G. McKechnie, Donn D. Moomaw, Michael Wenning, and Mark Brewer. Moomaw gave the invocation at President Ronald Reagan's first inauguration in 1981.  He also gave the invocation at President Reagan's state funeral and presided over a private service for the family of First Lady Nancy Reagan before her state funeral at the Reagan Library.

 
Drew Sams was officially ordained as the church's senior pastor and head of staff on April 13, 2014, where he joined Care Crawford, Kim Dorr-Tilley, and later Mike Morgan on the church's leadership team.

Congregation

Some notable members of the church include: 

 Maria Shriver
 Denzel Washington
 Ronald Reagan
 Nancy Reagan
 Leonardo DiCaprio.

Activities
Bel Air Church helped found "Imagine LA", a mentorship program that matches families exiting homelessness with volunteer teams from faith communities, corporations, and other committed organizations.

The church has an outreach department that partners with other community service organizations in Los Angeles.

For over thirty years, the church has packed and distributed over 10,000 meals to those in need at Thanksgiving.

References

External links

Bel Air Church on Facebook
Bel Air Church Instagram
Bel Air Church YouTube

Presbyterian Church (USA) churches
Presbyterian churches in California
Churches in Los Angeles
Christian organizations established in 1956
Presbyterian organizations established in the 20th century
Bel Air, Los Angeles
Megachurches in California
Presbyterian megachurches in the United States